The Taifa of Tavira was a medieval Islamic taifa Moorish kingdom in what is now southern Portugal. It existed only from around 1146 to 1150. It was centered in the city of Tavira.

List of Emirs

'Umarid dynasty
 'Umar: fl. mid-12th century (1146–1150)
 To Almoravids: c. 1150–1250

1150 disestablishments
States and territories established in 1146
Tavira
12th century in Portugal
Taifas in Portugal
History of the Algarve